Estradiol/norethisterone (E2/NET), tentative brand name Netagen or Netagen 403, was a combination of estradiol (E2), an estrogen, and norethisterone (NET), a progestin, which was studied as a birth control pill to prevent pregnancy in women. It was taken by mouth and contained 4 mg micronized E2 and 3 mg NET per tablet. The medication was developed by Novo Pharmaceuticals in Denmark and was never marketed.

Two related formulations were Netagen 423 (4 mg estradiol, 2 mg estriol, 3 mg norethisterone) and Netasyn (50 μg ethinylestradiol, 3 mg norethisterone), were also studied but never marketed.

See also
 List of combined sex-hormonal preparations § Estrogens and progestogens
 Estradiol-containing birth control pill

References

Abandoned drugs
Combined oral contraceptives